This is a list of bridges and viaducts in Chile, including those for pedestrians and vehicular traffic.

Historical and architectural interest bridges

Major road and railway bridges 

See also 

 Transport in Chile
 List of highways in Chile
 Empresa de los Ferrocarriles del Estado
 History of rail transport in Chile
 Geography of Chile
 List of rivers of Chile
 :es:Anexo:Puentes sobre el río Mapocho en Santiago de Chile  - Bridges over the Mapocho river in Santiago de Chile

Notes and references 
 Notes

 

 Others references

Further reading

External links 

 
 
 
 
 

Chile
 
Bridges
Bridges